Dominus is the Latin word for master or owner.  saw use as a  Roman imperial title. It was also the Latin title of the feudal, superior and mesne, lords, and an ecclesiastical and academic title. The ecclesiastical title was rendered through the French  in English as sir, making it a common prefix for parsons before the Reformation, as in Sir Hugh Evans in Shakespeare's Merry Wives of Windsor. Its shortened form Dom remains used as a prefix of honor for ecclesiastics of the Catholic Church, and especially for members of the Benedictine and other religious orders. The title was formerly also used as is, for a Bachelor of Arts.

Many romance languages use some form of the honorific Don, which derives from this term. Further, the Romanian word for God, derives from this title through the Latin phrase

Etymology 

The term derives from the Proto-Italic  meaning "[he] of the house," ultimately relating to the Proto-Indo-European root  meaning "to build," through domus.

Roman imperial use 

Originating from its use by slaves to address their masters, the title was sporadically used in addressing emperors throughout the Principate, usually in the form of excessive flattery (or political invective) when referring to the emperor. As a title of sovereignty, the term under the Roman Republic had all the associations of the Greek Tyrannos; refused during the early Principate, it finally became an official title of the Roman Emperors under Diocletian. Augustus actively discouraged the practice, and Tiberius in particular is said to have reviled it as sycophancy. Domitian encouraged its use, but none of the emperors used the term in any semi-official capacity until the reign of Aurelian in AD 274, where coins were issued bearing the inscription deus et dominus natus.

However, under Diocletian the term  was adopted as part of the emperor's official titulature, forming part of Diocletian's radical reforms. It's from this use that the term Dominate is sometimes used to refer to the period of Roman history beginning with the reign of Diocletian.

English use 

The feminine form  was a title formerly given to noble ladies who held a barony in their own right in old English Law. The most common are madam and its contracted form ma'am. Another notable example is Dame, a more narrow equivalent to Sir used for recipients of chivalric honors. (Damehood being the equivalent to the male knighthood.)

Cambridge University continues to use both  and  abbreviated as Dnus. and Dna. respectively, for those who have achieved a BA, and its derived term Don continues to see use in reference to professors, lecturers, and fellows at Oxford and Cambridge.

See also 
 Don (honorific) - for the derived Romance language titles
 Roman Empire

References 

Ancient Roman titles
Medieval titles